Georgia and the North Atlantic Treaty Organization (NATO) enjoy good relations. Georgia is not currently a member of NATO, but has been promised by NATO to be admitted in the future.

Cooperation officially began in 1994 when Georgia joined the NATO-run Partnership for Peace. Georgia has moved quickly following the Rose Revolution in 2003 to seek closer ties and eventual membership with NATO (although the previous administration had also indicated that they desired NATO membership a year before the revolution took place). Georgia's powerful northern neighbor, Russia, has opposed the closer ties, including those expressed at the 2008 Bucharest summit where NATO members promised that Georgia would eventually join the organization. In the 7 December 2011 statement of the North Atlantic Council Georgia was designated as an "aspirant country".

Complications in the relationship between NATO and Georgia includes presence of Russian forces in Georgian territory as a result of multiple recent conflicts, like the 2008 South Ossetia war, over the territories of Abkhazia and South Ossetia, which are home to large numbers of Russian nationals. A nonbinding referendum in 2008 resulted in 77% of voters supporting NATO accession.

The current Georgia–NATO relations occurs in the framework of the Substantial NATO–Georgia Package (SNGP), a set of measures at the strategic, tactical and operational levels launched in 2014. The package includes a Defence Institution Building School, NATO–Georgia Joint Training and Evaluation Centre and Logistics Facility, the facilitation of multi-national and regional military drills, and other measures.

Background
Georgia has sought to join NATO, which it views as a guarantee of stability to the region by acting as a counterweight to Russia, which it considers a dangerous neighbor. Located on the northeastern border of NATO member Turkey, Georgia is the furthest from the Atlantic of all countries currently considering NATO membership. Article 10 of the North Atlantic Treaty limits membership extension to European states.

In 2006, the Georgian parliament voted unanimously for a bill which calls for the integration of Georgia into NATO. On 5 January 2008 Georgia held a non-binding referendum on NATO membership with 77% voting in favor of joining the organization.

Russia sees NATO's eastward expansion as a threat against their strategic interests in Europe and has accused the West of having double standards.

Post-Soviet era

After the collapse of the Soviet Union, Georgia became an independent nation under the nationalistic leadership of Zviad Gamsakhurdia. Georgia immediately had problems with Russian support of Ossetians in Georgia. Like others, Georgia joined the NATO-run North Atlantic Cooperation Council in 1992 and the Partnership for Peace, signing their agreement on March 23, 1994.  Georgia was a founding member of the Collective Security Treaty Organization, an alternative Russian-led military alliance, in 1994, but withdrew in 1999.

In 1996, Georgia submitted their first Individual Partnership Plan, and in 1997 ratified the Status of Forces Agreement. Georgia opened official relations with NATO in 1998 by opening a diplomatic mission and presenting an ambassador.

The first joint military exercises occurred in Poti in 2001, with more in 2002.

The 2003 Rose Revolution replaced Georgian President Eduard Shevardnadze with Mikheil Saakashvili, who promoted closer ties with western institutions including NATO.

In 2004, Georgian forces started to work with NATO forces in the International Security Assistance Force in Afghanistan, as part of the election security force.

On 14 February 2005 NATO and Georgia signed an agreement on the appointment of Partnership for Peace (PfP) liaison officer. The liaison office between them came into force then and was assigned to Georgia. On 2 March 2005, the agreement was signed on the provision of the host nation supporting and aiding transit of NATO forces and NATO personnel. On March 6–9, 2006, the Individual Partnership Action Plan (IPAP) implementation interim assessment team arrived in Tbilisi.

On 13 April 2006, the discussion of the assessment report on implementation of the IPAP was held at NATO Headquarters, within 26+1 format.

In September 2006, Georgia became the second country to be offered the "Intensified Dialogue" status, following a rapid change in foreign policy under President Mikhail Saakashvili, and what NATO perceived as a demonstration of military readiness during the 2006 Kodori crisis.

2008 Bucharest Summit
During NATO's 2008 Bucharest summit in Bucharest, United States and Poland called for Georgia to be allowed to join the Membership Action Plan (MAP). The alliance decided not to offer Georgia a MAP due to opposition from several countries, led by Germany and France, who feared the decision would anger Russia. Instead NATO countries assured the Georgian side in a special communiqué that they would eventually join the alliance once the requirement for membership were met. Members further pledged to review the decision in December 2008 at the meeting of NATO foreign ministers.

Responding on 11 April 2008 the head of the Russian military general Yuri Baluyevsky stated that if Georgia joins NATO, "Russia will take steps aimed at ensuring its interests along its borders and these will not only be military steps, but also steps of a different nature". The Ministry of Foreign Affairs of Georgia released a statement that said that it was "a demonstration of open aggression against Georgia" and called on the international community to react adequately to this "serious threat".

The NATO communiqué which promised the country eventual membership still angered Moscow. After the summit, Russian prime minister Vladimir Putin vowed support and protection to then-unrecognized republics of Abkhazia and South Ossetia, and even promising to open official Russian representations in the regions — a move which Georgia said violated international law and constituted a direct attack on a sovereign state. A Russian statement said "Any attempts to apply political, economic or, all the more, military pressure on Abkhazia and South Ossetia are hopeless and counterproductive." After the 2008 South Ossetia war, Russia recognized Georgia's two breakaway regions, South Ossetia and Abkhazia, as independent countries.

2008 Russia-Georgia War

On August 7, 2008, Georgia called for a unilateral ceasefire following days of exchanged gunfire between Georgian forces and South Ossetian separatists. Five and a half hours after Georgia's declared ceasefire, Georgia's Foreign Ministry sent troops into South Ossetia "to restore constitutional order in the entire region" The South Ossetian capital Tskhinvali became the site for a prolonged battle.

Russia responded with a larger assault that quickly moved beyond South Ossetia in Georgia and included the other breakaway region of Abkhazia. This ongoing dispute complicates NATO's relation with Russia, which has peacekeeping troops in both regions, internationally recognized as Georgian territory. The South Ossetia war further diminished the likelihood of Georgian accession to NATO in the near future according to several analysts. Others however see it as a justification for Georgian membership in NATO.

German Chancellor Angela Merkel said during the meeting with Russian president after the signing of a ceasefire agreement that the 2008 promise NATO made to Georgia in Bucharest was still standing. However, she did not indicate a time frame, nor did she retract the earlier insistence of Germany and France that Georgia must resolve its internal problems prior to any NATO membership. As of November 2008, there is not a consensus within NATO on a Georgian Membership Action Plan.

Post-war

On September 15, 2008 a NATO–Georgia Commission was established.

On April 4, 2009, the NATO heads of state released a joint statement after the Strasbourg–Kehl summit, pledging to maximise their advice, assistance and support for Georgia's and Ukraine's reform efforts. The statement reiterated that the two countries will become NATO members, but did not specify the time. It reaffirmed NATO's "continued support for the territorial integrity and sovereignty of Georgia within its internationally recognised borders". The statement said that Russia has not completely complied with its commitments undertaken under the August 12 and September 8 ceasefire accords and called for Moscow to reverse its recognition of Georgia's breakaway republics of Abkhazia and South Ossetia.

Under Fogh Rasmussen
On 21 November 2011, Russian President Dmitry Medvedev while addressing soldiers in Vladikavkaz near the Georgian border stated that the 2008 invasion had prevented any further NATO enlargement into the former Soviet sphere.

In May 2013, Georgian Prime Minister Bidzina Ivanishvili stated that his goal was to get a Membership Action Plan for his country from NATO in 2014. However, in June 2014 NATO officials announced that Georgia would not yet be invited to join the MAP process, but that NATO would implement a "substantive package" of cooperation measures with Georgia.

In 2014 prior to its 65th anniversary since its creation, NATO under Anders Fogh Rasmussen announced that it would not be offering any new countries membership into the organization that year. Analysts confirmed this as a sign that NATO members were becoming skeptical about further Eastern expansion due to worries about Russian retaliation to these new security guarantees so close to is borders.

Under Stoltenberg
In December 2017 during the US Presidency of Donald J. Trump, NATO Secretary General Jens Stoltenberg affirmed the support for Georgia's "eventual NATO membership".

In February 2019, in an interview with Voice of America Ben Hodges, a retired lieutenant-general of  United States Army Europe and now working for the defence think tank Center for European Policy Analysis said that Georgia has "nothing left to prove about NATO membership" and "accession of West Germany into NATO is a precedent for Georgia".

In September 2019, Russian Foreign Minister Sergey Lavrov was quoted as saying that if NATO accepts Georgian membership with the article on collective defence covering only Tbilisi-administered territory (i.e., excluding the two Georgian territories Abkhazia and Tskhinvali (aka South Ossetia), both of which are currently occupied by Russia), "we will not start a war, but such conduct will undermine our relations with NATO and with countries who are eager to enter the alliance."

On 29 September 2020, Stoltenberg called on Georgia to use every opportunity to move closer to the Alliance and speed up preparations for membership. Stoltenberg stressed that earlier this year, the Allies agreed to further strengthen the NATO-Georgia partnership. According to him, NATO welcomes the progress made by Georgia in carrying out reforms, modernizing its armed forces and strengthening democracy. It is worth noting that so far Georgia's calls for membership in such formulations have not appeared in the rhetoric of the Secretary General of the Alliance. At the same time, NATO recognizes Georgia's aspirations for membership in the Alliance, as in the case of Ukraine.

At the end of November 2020, it became known that the NATO Summit in 2021 will consider a return to the "NATO open door policy", including the issue of providing Georgia with a Membership Action Plan (MAP).

On 17 February 2022, Georgian Defence Minister, Juansher Burchuladze, was quoted as saying that joining NATO is the only way to preserve Georgia's territorial integrity.  This occurred following a meeting with Stoltenberg in Brussels.  Georgian President Salome Zourabichvili, who took office in 2018, has conceded that NATO membership might not be possible while Russia occupies Georgian territory, and has sought to focus on European Union membership, which Georgia submitted its application for in May 2022.

NATO-led missions involving Georgia 
 Kosovo Force, 1999–2008; 
 Operation Active Endeavour in the Mediterranean, 2010–2016; 
 International Security Assistance Force in Afghanistan, 2004–2014; 
 Resolute Support Mission in Afghanistan, 2015–2021;
 NATO Response Force, 2015–present.

Georgia's foreign relations with NATO member states

See also 
 Foreign relations of Georgia 
 Foreign relations of NATO 
 Enlargement of NATO
 Georgia–European Union relations
 Ukraine–NATO relations
 NATO–Russia relations
 Armenia–NATO relations
 Azerbaijan–NATO relations
 State Ministry for Euro-Atlantic Integration of Georgia
 Russo-Georgian War
 Finland–NATO relations 
 Sweden–NATO relations

References

External links
NATO-Georgia relations The NATO website.
NATO information center in Georgia
Facebook support group "I bet I can find one million people who support Georgia's NATO membership".

NATO
Enlargement of NATO
 
NATO relations